Columbia Central Fire Station, also known as Columbia Fire Department Headquarters and Senate Street Station, is a historic fire station located at Columbia, South Carolina. It was built between 1949 and 1951, and consists of two buildings and a structure. The main building is a two-story, rectangular, brick building in the Moderne / International Style. It has a flat roof and features horizontal bands of windows. The one-story, brick fire truck garage building and the main building were constructed in 1949–1950. The drill tower is a six-story reinforced concrete structure built in 1951. The complex served as the Columbia Fire Department's Headquarters from 1950 until 1995.

It was added to the National Register of Historic Places in 2009.

References

Fire stations on the National Register of Historic Places in South Carolina
International style architecture in South Carolina
Moderne architecture in South Carolina
Fire stations completed in the 20th century
Buildings and structures in Columbia, South Carolina
National Register of Historic Places in Columbia, South Carolina
1951 establishments in South Carolina
Government buildings completed in 1951